The Department of Environment and Primary Industries (DEPI) was a state government department responsible for protecting the environment, boosting productivity in Victoria's food and fibre sector, management of natural resources and managing water resources in the state of Victoria, Australia. It was created in April 2013 by merging the Department of Primary Industries with the Department of Sustainability and Environment.

The Department secretary was Adam Fennessy.

After the 2014 Victorian State Election, Premier Daniel Andrews announced that the department would be renamed to the Department of Environment, Land, Water and Planning (DELWP) effective 1 January 2015. The Agriculture portfolio was moved to the new Department of Economic Development, Jobs, Transport and Resources.

See also
 Meredith Mitchell, Pasture agronomist

References

External links 
Department of Environment and Primary Industries

Environment of Victoria (Australia)
Environment
Government agencies established in 2013
2013 establishments in Australia
2015 disestablishments in Australia